The 2013–14 División de Honor Femenina is the 75th season of the top flight of the Spanish domestic women's field hockey competitions since its inception in 1934. It began in autumn 2013 and will finish around early June.

The defending champions were Real Sociedad, while R.S. Tenis and Castelldefels were the teams promoted from División de Honor B.

Club de Campo became champions by winning the final series 2-1 after a home defeat and two away wins in San Sebastián.

Competition

Format
Competition format changes for 2013–14 season. The competition it divides in three stages; regular season, 2nd stage and playoffs. Regular season comprises 11 matchdays played from October to March through a one-leg format. When regular season finish, table splits into two groups of 6 teams each; in Group 1, top four teams qualify for final stage, while in the Group B, bottom three teams are relegated to División de Honor B. Points during regular season/2nd stage are awarded as follows:

2 points for a win
1 point for a draw

Teams

Standings

Regular season

Source: Real Federación Española de Hockey

2nd stage

Championship group
In the 2nd stage, teams advance with points obtained in regular season against the same group teams.

Relegation group
In the 2nd stage, teams advance with points obtained in regular season against the same group teams.

Final stage

Semifinals

1st leg

2nd leg

Club de Campo won series 2–0 and advanced to Final.

3rd leg

Real Sociedad won series 2–1 and advanced to Final.

Final

1st leg

2nd leg

Series tied 1–1.

3rd leg

Relegation playoff

|}

1st leg

2nd leg

SPV'51 won 8–1 on aggregate and remained in División de Honor.

Top goalscorers 

Regular season/2nd stage only.

See also
División de Honor de Hockey Hierba 2013–14

References

External links
Official site
Championship playoff schedule

División de Honor Femenina de Hockey Hierba
2013–14 in European field hockey
field hockey
field hockey
2014 in women's field hockey
2013 in women's field hockey